The Long Island Serial Killer (also known as The Gilgo Beach Murders) is a 2013 American true crime horror film loosely based on the victims of the unidentified Long Island serial killer. He is believed to have murdered ten to seventeen women on Long Island between 1996 and 2010. The film is written by Joseph DiPietro and Michael Eimicke, and directed by DiPietro.

Plot
A serial killer is at large in New York, murdering prostitutes and disposing their bodies on the beaches of Long Island. A virtuous college student turns to escorting for noble reasons, unknowingly putting herself directly in his path.

Cast
 Jennifer Polansky as Tina Everett
 Adam Ginsberg as The Killer
 Dewey Wynn as Mark
 Renee Kay as Sheryl Graham
 Ryan Kaiser as Jimmy
 Lindsay DeLuca as Elizabeth Stark
 Matthew Smolko as Rick
 Josephine Pizzino as Jane Everett
 Stav Livne as Sarah Coleman
 Joe Mankowski as Benjamin Harvey
 Guy Balotine as Jude
 Chrissy Laboy as Michelle Coleman
 Sara Antkowiak as Colette
 Patrick Devaney as Detective Kaplan
 Jeffrey Alan Solomon as Tyler

Production
The film was shot over the course of ten consecutive days, primarily in Nassau County and  Manhattan, with additional scenes shot in Suffolk County, the boroughs of Queens and Brooklyn, as well as the city of Yonkers, and parts of Fairfield County, Connecticut. The film was scored using archival Production music from the KPM music library. DiPietro said the movie is "a work of fiction inspired by actual events". He did not want to make a documentary, and he explores "the lost girls" rather than focus on the killer.

Reception
The film premiered at Anthology Film Archives in New York City on November 12, 2013. The Huffington Post described the independent feature as a "compelling thriller about unsolved murder, the underside of the Internet, and the compulsive nature of guarding secrets."

References

External links
 
 

2013 horror films
2013 films
American horror thriller films
Films set in the 1990s
Films set in the 2000s
Long Island in fiction
Crime films based on actual events
2010s English-language films
2010s American films